Baptiste John "Bap" Manzini (August 27, 1920 – May 9, 2008) was a professional American football center and high school football coach.

Manzini was born August 27, 1920, in Treveskyn, Pennsylvania. He attended Saint Vincent College, where he was an all-state center. Upon graduation, he joined the United States Air Force. He played in three seasons in the National Football League, 1944 and 1945 for the Philadelphia Eagles and 1948, one game for the Detroit Lions and three games again for the Eagles. When his playing career ended, he coached high school football in Pennsylvania for 30 years at the former Bellmar High School and at Thomas Jefferson High School. Overall, his record was 203–74–8.

References

External links
 Obituary in the Pittsburgh Post-Gazette, May 12, 2008.
 

1920 births
2008 deaths
American football centers
Detroit Lions players
Philadelphia Eagles players
Saint Vincent Bearcats football coaches
Saint Vincent Bearcats football players
High school football coaches in Pennsylvania
People from Allegheny County, Pennsylvania
Players of American football from Pennsylvania
Burials at Monongahela Cemetery
United States Army Air Forces personnel of World War II